The Way of Youth is a 1934 British crime film directed by Norman Walker and starring Irene Vanbrugh, Aileen Marson and Sebastian Shaw. It was made at British and Dominions Elstree Studios as a quota quickie.

Premise
A young woman and her army officer fiancé fall into heavy debt at a gambling club run by her own estranged grandmother.

Cast
 Irene Vanbrugh as Madame Bonnard  
 Aileen Marson as Carol Bonnard  
 Sebastian Shaw as Lieut. Alan Marmon  
 Henry Victor as M. Sylvestre  
 Diana Wilson as Grace Bonnard  
 Robert Rendel as Sir Peter Marmon  
 Leslie Bradley as Lieut. Burton

References

Bibliography
 Chibnall, Steve. Quota Quickies: The Birth of the British 'B' Film. British Film Institute, 2007.
 Low, Rachael. Filmmaking in 1930s Britain. George Allen & Unwin, 1985.
 Wood, Linda. British Films, 1927-1939. British Film Institute, 1986.

External links

1934 films
British crime films
1934 crime films
1930s English-language films
Films directed by Norman Walker
Quota quickies
Films set in London
Films about gambling
British and Dominions Studios films
Films shot at Imperial Studios, Elstree
British black-and-white films
1930s British films